A general election was held in the U.S. state of New Jersey on November 5, 2019. Primary elections were held on June 4. The only state positions that were up in this election cycle were all 80 seats in the New Jersey General Assembly and one Senate special election in the 1st Legislative District. In addition to the State Legislative elections, numerous county offices and freeholders in addition to municipal offices were up for election. There were no statewide questions on the ballot in 2019, though some counties and municipalities may have had a local question asked. Non-partisan local elections, some school board elections, and some fire district elections also happened in 2019.

State Senate
One special election was held in the 1st Legislative District to complete the unexpired term of Jeff Van Drew. Van Drew resigned on January 2, 2019, following his election to Congress. On January 7, Democratic committee members in Atlantic, Cape May, and Cumberland counties selected Assemblyman Bob Andrzejczak as the appointed replacement, and he was sworn in on January 15. Andrzejczak was later defeated in the special election in November by Republican Mike Testa.

An additional vacancy in the State Senate was created by the September 2019 death of Anthony Bucco.
The deadline for a 2019 special election having passed, a special election will be held in 2020 pending which his son Tony Bucco was appointed by a party convention to hold the seat on an interim basis.

Democratic primary 
Declared
 Bob Andrzejczak, appointed incumbent Senator

Republican primary 
Declared
Mike Testa, Chairman of the Cumberland County Republican Party
Withdrew
Sam Fiocchi, former State Assemblyman and candidate for NJ-2 in 2018

General election 
Results

General Assembly
All 80 seats of the New Jersey General Assembly were up for election. Democrats held a 54–26 supermajority in the lower house prior to the election. In the elections, the Republicans gained 2 seats, failing to gain control of the chamber.

Summary of Results

References

 
New Jersey